Curel may refer to the following places in France:

Curel, Alpes-de-Haute-Provence, a commune in the Alpes-de-Haute-Provence department 
Curel, Haute-Marne, a commune in the Haute-Marne department

See also 
François, Vicomte de Curel, French dramatist